Irina Nikolaevna Belova (née Ilyichova born 27 March 1968 in Angarsk) is a retired heptathlete from Russia. In her early career she represented USSR, with a fourth place at the 1990 European Championships and a bronze medal at the 1991 World Championships. Her career highlight came in 1992 as she won an Olympic silver medal. In February the same year she set the world record in indoor pentathlon with 4991 points. She originally won the pentathlon at the 1993 World Indoor Championships, but failed a drug test and received a four-year suspension. Upon returning she won two silver medals at the European and World Indoor Championships respectively. She retired after the 2001 season.

Personal bests

Achievements

See also
List of sportspeople sanctioned for doping offences

References

External links
 
 Irina Belova at All-Athletics.com

1968 births
Living people
People from Angarsk
Russian heptathletes
Russian sportspeople in doping cases
Soviet heptathletes
Athletes (track and field) at the 1992 Summer Olympics
Doping cases in athletics
Olympic athletes of the Unified Team
Olympic silver medalists for the Unified Team
World Athletics Championships medalists
Olympic silver medalists in athletics (track and field)
CIS Athletics Championships winners
Medalists at the 1992 Summer Olympics
Sportspeople from Irkutsk Oblast